The Beethoven House (Beethoven-Haus) is a museum in the village of Gneixendorf near Krems an der Donau in Austria. It is a former residence of Ludwig van Beethoven and it is part of the cultural heritage of Austria.

The residence currently features several rooms furnished as a private museum The museum offers tours by appointment. The rooms where Van Beethoven resided are on the second floor. It concerns four chamber, a large hallway and an adjoined piano chamber. The rooms have been decorated with various mementos. Also there are a hearth and lamps which originate from the composer's lifetime. In the garden, there is a large rock featuring a copper portrait of Van Beethoven.

In this residence he composed the new final movement of his String Quartet No. 13 (Beethoven) (opus 130). He had initially intended the Große Fuge to be the final movement, which was later renamed opus 133.

The house was owned by his brother. Van Beethoven came here with his nephew and ward. His nephew had attempted suicide on 6 August 1826 and he had spent the weeks before their arrival in a hospital. Van Beethoven accepted his brother's invitation to stay over, and resided in the house between 25 September and 2 November 1826. The house is currently a part of the cultural heritage of Austria.

See also
 List of music museums
 List of historical sites associated with Ludwig van Beethoven

References 

Music museums in Austria
Museums in Vienna
Ludwig van Beethoven